Airampoa soehrensii is a species of Airampoa found in Argentina, Bolivia, Chile, and Peru

References

External links

soehrensii
Flora of Argentina
Flora of Bolivia
Flora of Chile
Flora of Peru
Cacti of South America